KernelTrap was a computing news website which covered topics related to the development of free and open source operating system kernels, and especially, the Linux kernel.

News stories usually consisted of a summary of a recent discussion from a development mailing list (Linux kernel mailing list) followed by the entire contents of several messages from the discussion. Each story had moderated threaded discussion attached to it. The site also included a forum for general discussion of computing topics.

The site used the Drupal content management system. Kerneltrap was hosted by the Oregon State University Open Source Lab from May 2005.

The site was operated by Jeremy Andrews.

Current status
The site has not been active since 12 April 2010, only 12 days after it became active again after a full year without any news items (except a note about upgrading the site engine, Drupal). Since May of 2021, the kerneltrap.org domain points to a lengthy KernelTrap-style interview with Linus Torvalds on Jeremy's consulting company website.

Books
KernelTrap has been referenced in several books.
 Linux Kernel Development by Robert Love
 Red Hat Linux 9 Bible by Christopher Negus
 SUSE Linux 10.0 Unleashed by Mike McCallister
 Measuring Information Systems Delivery Quality by Evan W. Duggan and Han Reichgelt

See also
 LWN.net

References

Linux websites